Vieweg is a German surname. Notable people with the surname include:

Alexander Vieweg (born 1986), German javelin thrower
Friedrich Vieweg (1761–1835), German publisher
Johannes Vieweg (born 1958), German-American medical professor
Karl Friedrich Vieweg (fl. 1790), German entomologist
Kurt Vieweg (1911–1976), German politician

See also
Vieweg+Teubner Verlag, a German publishing company

German-language surnames